Flora is a town in Monroe Township, Carroll County, Indiana, United States. The population was 2,036 at the 2010 census. It is part of the Lafayette, Indiana Metropolitan Statistical Area.

History
A post office was established at Flora in 1873. Flora was named for its founder, John Flora.

Geography
Flora is located at  (40.545819, -86.523367).

Demographics

2010 census
As of the census of 2010, there were 2,036 people, 858 households, and 549 families living in the town. The racial makeup of the town was 97.5% White, 0.3% African American, 1.1% from other races, and 0.9% from two or more races. Hispanic or Latino of any race were 2.6% of the population.

There were 858 households, of which 30.5% had children under the age of 18 living with them, 48.7% were married couples living together, 10.8% had a female householder with no husband present, 4.4% had a male householder with no wife present, and 36.0% were non-families. 31.7% of all households were made up of individuals, and 17.8% had someone living alone who was 65 years of age or older. The average household size was 2.37 and the average family size was 2.96.

The median age in the town was 40.4 years. 25.5% of residents were under the age of 18; 7.3% were between the ages of 18 and 24; 22.2% were from 25 to 44; 25.8% were from 45 to 64; and 19.2% were 65 years of age or older. The gender makeup of the town was 46.8% male and 53.2% female.

2000 census
As of the census of 2000, there were 2,227 people, 906 households, and 609 families living in the town. The racial makeup of the town was 98.16% White, 0.54% African American, 0.04% Native American, 0.04% Pacific Islander, 0.85% from other races, and 0.36% from two or more races. Hispanic or Latino of any race were 2.02% of the population.

There were 906 households, out of which 29.4% had children under the age of 18 living with them, 53.8% were married couples living together, 9.6% had a female householder with no husband present, and 32.7% were non-families. 29.4% of all households were made up of individuals, and 15.6% had someone living alone who was 65 years of age or older. The average household size was 2.36 and the average family size was 2.91.

In the town, the population was spread out, with 23.6% under the age of 18, 8.6% from 18 to 24, 26.4% from 25 to 44, 19.9% from 45 to 64, and 21.5% who were 65 years of age or older. The median age was 39 years. For every 100 females there were 83.9 males. For every 100 females age 18 and over, there were 79.5 males.

The median income for a household in the town was $37,400, and the median income for a family was $43,257. Males had a median income of $35,398 versus $20,281 for females. The per capita income for the town was $18,863. About 4.4% of families and 6.3% of the population were below the poverty line, including 9.9% of those under age 18 and 7.4% of those age 65 or over.

Education
The town has a free lending library, the Flora-Monroe Township Public Library.

Notable people 
 Paul S. Dunkin, writer, librarian and professor.

References

External links

 Town website

Towns in Carroll County, Indiana
1872 establishments in Indiana